Eduard Ritter von Weber (May 12, 1870 in Munich – June 20, 1934 in Würzburg) was a German mathematician.

In 1893 he was awarded the Ph.D. from the University of Munich (his dissertation being titled Studien zur Theorie der infinitesimalen Transformationen, Gustav C. Bauer, advisor). Habilitation followed at the University of Munich in 1895, becoming full professor there in 1903. He moved to the University of Würzburg in 1907.

Von Weber concerned himself particularly with partial differential equations, in particular the Pfaff problem, and wrote the article "Partial Differential Equations" in the Enzyklopädie der mathematischen Wissenschaften (Encyclopedia of the Mathematical Sciences).

Von Weber had versatile interests and spoke numerous languages, including Russian, Portuguese, Spanish, Norwegian, Persian, Arabic, Hebrew, and Irish.

References
Würzburger Mathematikgeschichte: Die Periode der Analytiker, University of Würzburg

External links
 

1870 births
1934 deaths
Bavarian nobility
19th-century German mathematicians
Mathematical analysts
Scientists from Munich
Ludwig Maximilian University of Munich alumni
Academic staff of the Ludwig Maximilian University of Munich
Academic staff of the University of Würzburg
20th-century German mathematicians